Étude in C-sharp minor, Op. 2, No. 1, is an étude for piano, written by Russian composer Alexander Scriabin in 1887.

Background
This étude was written in 1887, when Scriabin was just 16 years old. It was the first of the Three Pieces, Op. 2, and was one of Scriabin's earliest successes.

Analysis

Étude Op. 2 No. 1 is in 3/4 time and is in the key of C-sharp minor.

The melody is poignant and heartfelt, showing many characteristics of Russian Gypsy music. It is accompanied by repeated chords in both hands, featuring rich harmonies, inner voices, and large spreads in the left hand. The dynamics of the piece are varied constantly to display emotion and passion and to add interest. The piece features many key changes but finally concludes in the original key. Although it is a slow and somber piece, like many other études, it is considerably difficult to perfect.

This étude lasts for about three minutes.

Recordings

See also
List of compositions by Alexander Scriabin

References

External links
Scores at the IMSLP
[ Étude Op. 2 No. 1] at Allmusic

Scriabin
Compositions by Alexander Scriabin
Piano compositions in the Romantic era
1887 compositions
Compositions in C-sharp minor